Cornelius Houseman Elting, more frequently known as C. H. Elting or Cornelius H. Elting, (1856-1922) was born on October 15, 1866 in Shelby County, Missouri. When he was thirteen years old, he moved with his parents, Richard O. and Mary Short Elting, to western Kansas. where he obtained his early education. During the winters, he attended public schools, then later attended high school and took a two-year preparatory course at Kansas University. Then he enrolled in the Kansas University School of Law and graduated with an LLB degree in 1896.
He earned his a law degree at the University of Kansas School of Law in 1894 He practiced law for a few months in West Plains, Missouri, before moving to Indian Territory in February 1897, where he settled in the community of Caddo.  In 1899, he moved to what would become the present city of Durant, Oklahoma and served as a bankruptcy referee for a few years. He soon became active in politics and joined the Republican party, winning election in 1903 as district judge for the Durant District. 

In 1920, Elting was nominated to run for a position on the Oklahoma State Supreme Court (representing Judicial District 2), which he won at the November 1920 general election. In March, 1922, he became seriously ill, and his health continued to decline until he died at his home in Durant on December 3, 1922.

Notes

References 

1856 births
1922 deaths
University of Kansas School of Law alumni
People from Shelby County, Missouri
People from Durant, Oklahoma
Justices of the Oklahoma Supreme Court